Arkles Bay is one of the northernmost suburbs of the contiguous Auckland metropolitan area located in New Zealand. It is part of the Albany Ward area for local government purposes. Arkles Bay is known for its sheltered beaches, suitable for swimming and paddle boarding.

Demographics
It is part of the larger Whangaparāoa Central statistical area.

Arkles Bay had a population of 252 at the 2018 New Zealand census, an increase of 9 people (3.7%) since the 2013 census, and an increase of 27 people (12.0%) since the 2006 census. There were 111 households, comprising 117 males and 132 females, giving a sex ratio of 0.89 males per female, with 39 people (15.5%) aged under 15 years, 36 (14.3%) aged 15 to 29, 120 (47.6%) aged 30 to 64, and 57 (22.6%) aged 65 or older.

Ethnicities were 91.7% European/Pākehā, 8.3% Māori, 3.6% Pacific peoples, and 6.0% Asian. People may identify with more than one ethnicity.

Although some people chose not to answer the census's question about religious affiliation, 51.2% had no religion, 36.9% were Christian, 1.2% were Hindu and 2.4% were Buddhist.

Of those at least 15 years old, 45 (21.1%) people had a bachelor's or higher degree, and 36 (16.9%) people had no formal qualifications. 51 people (23.9%) earned over $70,000 compared to 17.2% nationally. The employment status of those at least 15 was that 96 (45.1%) people were employed full-time, 42 (19.7%) were part-time, and 6 (2.8%) were unemployed.

References

Hibiscus and Bays Local Board Area
Populated places in the Auckland Region
Beaches of the Auckland Region
Hibiscus Coast